Mátészalka is a town in Szabolcs-Szatmár-Bereg county, in the Northern Great Plain region of eastern Hungary. It is on the Kraszna River, 52 kilometers from the city of Nyiregyhaza.

Geography

The town was the birthplace of actor Tony Curtis' father, Emanuel Schwartz.

Population
In 2001, the population of Mátészalka was nearly 96% Hungarian, 3% Romani, and 1% German. In recent years, however, people from America, India, Canada, and China have moved into Mátészalka (2021)

History 
Mátészalka was created from the merger of two large villages: Máté, founded in 1231 and Szalka, created in 1268. From the fifteenth century, Mátészalka was a market settlement. From 1920 - 1950 it was the seat of the authorities of some of the committees Szatmár, Ugocsa and Bereg remaining in Hungary after the Trianon Treaty. In 1969 Mátészalka received city rights. The city is the seat of the regional Szatmári Múzeum.

The actor Tony Curtis was born Bernard Schwarz, and his parents were from Mátészalka. His daughter, Jamie Lee Curtis, helped to refurbish the synagogue, which is where her grandparents worshipped. She also attended the opening of the Tony Curtis Memorial Museum and Cafe, which is located in Mátészalka. About 1,500 Jews from the town were taken to Auschwitz in 1944, after the Nazis occupied Hungary that March. In 1946, about 150 Jews returned, but many left after the 1956 Hungarian Revolution.

Twin towns – sister cities

Mátészalka is twinned with:

 Carei, Romania
 Humenné, Slovakia
 Kolbuszowa, Poland
 Mukachevo, Ukraine 
 Oberkochen, Germany
 Vittoria, Italy
 Zevenaar, Netherlands

References

External links 

  in Hungarian

Populated places in Szabolcs-Szatmár-Bereg County